Isaac Bonton (born July 15, 1998) is an American professional basketball player who last played for Neptūnas Klaipėda of the Lithuanian Basketball League. He played college basketball for the Montana State Bobcats, the Casper Thunderbirds, and the Washington State Cougars.

High school career
Bonton attended Columbia Christian Schools in Portland, Oregon. As a freshman, he played alongside Kameron Chatman and won the Class 1A state title. For his final three years, Bonton transferred to Parkrose High School in Portland. He missed part of his senior season due to a shoulder injury and completed high school as a three-time All-State selection. Bonton originally committed to playing college basketball for Portland before switching his commitment to Montana State because of a coaching change.

College career
Bonton left Montana State after 11 games in his freshman season due to disagreements with head coach Brian Fish. He averaged 7.8 points and 2.8 rebounds per game. Bonton transferred to Casper College, averaging 21.4 points, 5.6 assists and 5.5 rebounds per game as a sophomore. He led his team to a Region IX title and was named a Second Team National Junior College Athletic Association Division I All-American. For his junior season, Bonton moved to Washington State, choosing the Cougars over Kansas State and West Virginia. On January 18, 2020, he recorded a season-high 34 points, eight rebounds and eight assists in an 89–76 win over Oregon State. As a junior, Bonton averaged 15.3 points, four assists and 3.7 rebounds per game. He set the program record for free throw percentage during Pac-12 play, shooting 88.6 percent.

Professional career
On September 29, 2021, Bonton signed his first professional contract with Neptūnas Klaipėda of the Lithuanian Basketball League.

Career statistics

College

NCAA Division I

|-
| style="text-align:left;"| 2017–18
| style="text-align:left;"| Montana State
| 11 || 0 || 18.6 || .360 || .364 || .762 || 2.8 || 1.4 || .8 || .2 || 7.8
|-
| style="text-align:left;"| 2019–20
| style="text-align:left;"| Washington State
| 28 || 27 || 32.8 || .340 || .307 || .833 || 3.7 || 4.0 || 1.2 || .2 || 15.3
|-
| style="text-align:left;"| 2020–21
| style="text-align:left;"| Washington State
| 21 || 20 || 35.3 || .391 || .328 || .658 || 4.0 || 4.0 || 2.0 || .2 || 17.7
|- class="sortbottom"
| style="text-align:center;" colspan="2"| Career
| 60 || 47 || 31.1 || .362 || .319 || .744 || 3.6 || 3.5 || 1.4 || .2 || 14.8

JUCO

|-
| style="text-align:left;"| 2018–19
| style="text-align:left;"| Casper
| 31 || 31 || 28.8 || .436 || .365 || .843 || 5.5 || 5.6 || 1.8 || .5 || 21.4

Personal life
Bonton's childhood friend and former Portland State basketball player, Deante Strickland, was shot and killed in August 2019. He dedicates every game he plays to Strickland and his late grandmother.

References

External links
Washington State Cougars bio
Casper Thunderbirds bio

1998 births
Living people
American men's basketball players
Basketball players from Portland, Oregon
Casper Thunderbirds men's basketball players
Washington State Cougars men's basketball players
Montana State Bobcats men's basketball players
Point guards